Maxim Tomkin (born 14 March 1992) is a Russian professional ice hockey defenceman. He played with HC Dynamo Moscow of the Kontinental Hockey League (KHL) during the 2012–13 season.

References

External links

Living people
HC Dynamo Moscow players
Russian ice hockey defencemen
Sportspeople from Tashkent
1992 births